Carassioides acuminatus or black fish is a species of cyprinid fish in the subfamily Cyprininae. It is found in central and northern Vietnam and the Pearl River and Hainan in China. It may have been introduced into Laos. It occurs in slow flowing rivers with sandy or muddy beds. It has an omnivorous diet, including alga, insect larvae, zooplankton and organic detritus. It is sold in Vietnam for human consumption, where it valued as a food fish, and it is also used in aquaculture.

References

Carassioides
Cyprinid fish of Asia
Freshwater fish of China
Fish of Vietnam
Fish described in 1846
Taxa named by John Richardson (naturalist)